One Zero [Acoustic] (2007) is an album from Derek Webb containing new acoustic recordings of ten previously released songs. It was released the same day as One Zero (Remix), containing the same ten tracks remixed in an electronic style.

Track listing

Personnel

Band
Derek Webb – Vocals, Acoustic guitar

Technical
Produced & Recorded by – Derek Webb @ Sumner Studio, Nashville, TN
Additional Engineering by – Cason Cooley & Shane D. Wilson
Mixed by – Shane D. Wilson, Mixed @ Pentavarit
Mastered by – Jim DeMain @ Yes Master, Nashville, TN

References

Derek Webb albums
2007 remix albums